Hardi may refer to:
 Hardi (politician) (1918–1998), Indonesian former Deputy Prime Minister and Ambassador to Vietnam
 Hardi (artist) (born 1951), Indonesian artist
 French ship Hardi (1750)
 HMS Hardi (1797)
 Hardi, Raebareli, a village in Uttar Pradesh, India